Marat is a common given name for males from the former Soviet republics. 
Marat's language of origin is the Tatar language. Its meaning can be translated  into desire (desired), wish. It derives from the Turkish name Murat, itself derived from the Arabic Murad.

People named Marat

Marat Akbarov, former Soviet pairs figure skater
Marat Balagula
Marat Basharov, actor
Marat Bikmoev, football striker (soccer forward)
Marat Bisengaliev 
Marat Ganeyev, Russian track cyclist 
Marat Gelman
Marat Grigorian, Armenian professional kickboxer
Marat Izmailov, Russian football player
Marat Khusnullin, Russian Tatar politician
Marat Ksanayev
Marat Magkeyev, football (soccer) player
Marat Safin, Russian professional tennis player
Marat Shogenov
Marat Tazhin, Kazakh politician
Marat Zakirov, water polo player
Paolo "Marat" Lega (1868–1896), Italian anarchist

Other forms 

 Russian: Marat (Марат)
 Ukrainian: Marat (Марат)

See also
Marat (disambiguation), for people with the surname Marat and other meanings

References 

Websters Dictionary Online
Namepedia.org

Masculine given names